The men's singles tournament in tennis at the 2007 Pan American Games was held at Marapendi Club in Rio de Janeiro from July 23 to July 28.

Medalists

Seeds

Draw

Key

 INV = Tripartite Invitation
 IP = ITF place
 ALT = Alternate
 r = Retired
 w/o = Walkover

Finals

Top half

Section 1

Section 2

Bottom half

Section 3

Section 4

References
Results

Men's singles